Sir Dennis Charles White  (30 July 1910 – 17 October 1983), sometimes referred to as Tuan D.C. White, was a British colonial administrator in Sarawak and formerly the British High Commissioner to Brunei.

Career
White was educated at Bradfield College, then joined the service of the Rajah of Sarawak in 1932. Before World War II he served in areas where the Dayak majority were suspicious of the government in Kuching, and he played an active part in winning over rebel leaders. During the war he was a prisoner in Kuching, and afterwards, as one of the few experienced Sarawak officers to survive, he was closely involved in the difficult negotiations for Sarawak to be ceded to the British Crown. There was an anti-cession movement and the second Governor, Sir Duncan Stewart, was murdered shortly after he arrived; but a happier period followed the arrival of Sir Anthony Abell, the third Governor. White was then based in Sibu – "his good knowledge of the Dayak and Malay languages was one of his attributes that endeared him to the local people."

White was posted to Brunei in 1958 as British Resident; in the following year the constitution was changed, the post of Resident was abolished and White became the first British High Commissioner for Brunei. He retired in 1963 but served as Agent in London for Brunei 1967–82.

Honours 
Dennis White was appointed OBE in the 1953 Coronation Honours, CMG in the 1959 Queen's Birthday Honours, and knighted KBE in the 1962 New Year Honours. In 1963 the Sultan of Brunei awarded him the Family Order of Brunei, First Class. In 1970, he was given the title Yang Dimuliakan (The Honourable) Pehin Orang Kaya Datu Patinggi Maha Kornia Diraja by Sultan Hassanal Bolkiah at Lapau.

National 

  Order of the British Empire Knight Commander (KBE) – Sir 1962
  Order of St Michael and St George Companion (CMG) – 1959

Foreign 
 :
  Family Order of Seri Utama (DK) – Dato Seri Utama (31 March 1963)
  Order of Seri Paduka Mahkota Brunei First Class (SPMB) – Dato Seri Paduka

References

 

1910 births
1983 deaths
People educated at Bradfield College
British administrators in Sarawak
High Commissioners of the United Kingdom to Brunei
Knights Commander of the Order of the British Empire
Companions of the Order of St Michael and St George
Administrators in British Brunei